The Mata River is a river of the East Coast of the North Island of New Zealand.

Coordinates
Source 
Mouth 

Rivers of the Gisborne District
Rivers of New Zealand